Egils Bojārs (born 13 December 1968) is a Latvian bobsledder. He competed in the four man event at the 1998 Winter Olympics.

References

1968 births
Living people
Latvian male bobsledders
Olympic bobsledders of Latvia
Bobsledders at the 1998 Winter Olympics
People from Līvāni Municipality